Rajendra Pratap Sinha was an Indian politician. He was a Member of Parliament, representing Bihar in the Rajya Sabha the upper house of India's Parliament.

References

Rajya Sabha members from Bihar
Indian National Congress politicians
1915 births
Year of death missing